Lennart Carlström (born 3 July 1943) is a Swedish orienteering competitor. He is Relay World Champion from 1972, as a member of the Swedish winning team in the World Orienteering Championships in Jicin, Czechoslovakia.

References

1943 births
Living people
Swedish orienteers
Male orienteers
Foot orienteers
World Orienteering Championships medalists
20th-century Swedish people